Walltopia AD is a Bulgarian climbing wall and active entertainment manufacturer. It was founded in 1998 by Ivaylo Penchev and Metin Musov. Originally exclusively a climbing wall and other artificial rock surfaces manufacturer, since 2012 the company portfolio expanded into adventure park concepts and management.

Walltopia is currently the largest manufacturer of artificial climbing walls in the world by volume.

History

Founding and international growth (1998-2010)
Walltopia was founded in 1998 by Ivaylo Penchev and Metin Musov. Prior to the establishment of the company, the two were climbers, both from Veliko Tarnovo. The company began as a manufacturer of climbing walls, immediately taking on projects outside of Bulgaria due to low local demand. They opened their first foreign office in late 2006 in the United Kingdom. In 2006, they introduced mobile climbing walls and in 2007 they branched out to develop artificial rock surfaces not exclusively for climbing, but also for cosmetic purposes. They opened their United States office in early 2008, which has since become their largest foreign office by revenue. Since then, the company has opened foreign offices in multiple other major markets.

Branching out and strategic acquisitions (2010-Present)

In 2010, Walltopia opened a manufacturing plant in Letnitsa, and in 2012 expanded it to grow its production capacity. In 2012, the company branched out of traditional climbing walls and introduced amusement climbing walls aimed at children and climbing beginners, under the brand Fun Walls, and rope courses, under the brand Ropetopia.

A year later the company observed there was lack of operational knowledge in the active entertainment industry and decided to not only manufacture the equipment but to open an active entertainment center specifically designed for all ages. In 2013 was established the operations company Adventure Facility Concepts & Management and the first Funtopia® location opened mid of 2013 in the largest mall in Sofia, Bulgaria. With the success of the first Funtopia®, the team has looked to franchising as a way to expand the recreational center’s benefits to operators in other countries. Since that time, many Funtopia® locations have been opened in North America, Australia and Middle East with much larger variety of attractions connected to active entertainment.

That same year (2013), the company's portfolio expanded into amusement rides with Rollglider, a suspended ride with a steel track. In 2014, the company began construction of its new headquarters in Sofia Tech Park, becoming the first private investor to build in the park.

Walltopia introduced Harmonized Walls and e-walls in mid-2015. Later that year, the company accepted investments from two equity funds, Bulgarian private equity fund BlackPeak Capital and Chinese equity fund China-CEE. This facilitated their purchase of Salt Lake City-based climbing gym chain Momentum. Additionally, they opened a manufacturing facility for their newly introduced climbing mat production, under the brand Climbmat, and an R&D facility for adventure park-related products near Sofia in the Bozhurishte economic zone.

In 2016, the company added obstacle courses to its portfolio of adventure park products under the brand Ninja Course. In December of that year, the company moved into their new office building. In April 2017, Walltopia opened its flagship gym inside its new office building under the name Walltopa Climbing & Fitness.

In 2019, Walltopia finished construction on the world's tallest indoor climbing wall, at 43 meters, part of indoor adventure venue Clymb Abu Dhabi on the leisure island Yas Island in Abu Dhabi, United Arab Emirates. In 2020 they finished construction on the world's tallest outdoor climbing wall, measuring 85 meters, scaling the side of Copenhill in Copenhagen, Denmark.

Controversies

Sofia Tech Park

In 2017, the company's CEO Ivaylo Penchev sent out an open letter to the administration behind Sofia Tech Park, claiming that they were attempting to fine Walltopia for a delay the Mladost municipality had caused and that they had failed to deliver on their promises, concluding that the park is a failure. He also mentioned the Bozhurishte economic zone's failure to supply their factory with electricity in time.

Following the open letter, all members of the park's leadership were let go, a decision which the Ministry of Economy of Bulgaria claimed was unrelated to the letter.

Arson attack

In 2020, Walltopia headquarters suffered an arson attack targeting the pride flag which the company had hung from its office's facade in support of Sofia Pride. Walltopia had previously received attention for displaying the 21-meter rainbow flag in support of the parade starting in 2018.

References

External links
Walltopia website
Adventure Facility Concepts & Management
Funtopia website
Rollglider website

Entertainment companies of Bulgaria
Companies based in Sofia